The International Association of Speakers Bureaus (IASB) is a 501c6 nonprofit trade membership organization of speakers bureaus, lecture agencies and speaker management companies located around the world. Founded in 1986, IASB provides leadership to the bureau industry through education, resources and partnerships with organizations that support the meetings and events industry.

History 
In 1986, the International Group of Agencies and Bureaus (IGAB) was founded by Dottie Walters and is headquartered in Arizona. In July 2000, the Board of Governors of IGAB voted to form a separate organization called the International Association of Speakers' Offices (IASB). In 2002, IGAB merged with the IASB, incorporating it as a nonprofit organization in Indiana on July 1, 2002. In 2010, the organization moved its headquarters to Arizona.

IASB is a member of the Events Industry Council and the NSA-IASB Council and works collaboratively with other organizations in the Meetings and Events Industry to provide support, guidance and information for its members. Among the partner organizations are:

 American Society of Association Executives (ASAE)
 Events Industry Council (EIC)
 Global Speakers Federation
 Meeting Professionals International (MPI)
 National Speakers Association (NSA)
 Professional Convention Management Association (PCMA)

Presidents since its foundation

Objectives 
The Mission of the International Association of Speakers Bureaus (IASB) is to provide global leadership in facilitating the exchange of ideas and expertise, advocating for our value, and promoting standards of excellence, for the speaker bureau industry.

IASB programs provide the speakers bureau community with unparalleled opportunities to learn, collaborate and build beneficial relationships.  Featuring seasoned industry professionals, recognized subject matter experts and thought-leaders from around the globe, participants benefit from different perspectives while taking away essential business practices and specialized knowledge with the added benefit of previewing professional speakers.

ENGAGE is the premiere event of the year and the largest gathering of speaker bureau, agency and speaker management professionals in the world. The annual convention provides members with unparalleled opportunities to learn, engage and build relationships - a must attend event of the year for owners and employees of companies that operate as speakers bureau, lecture agency or speaker management company.

IASBtalks is a special curated program designed to deliver exceptional value and exclusive opportunities for speakers and members. The IASB Speaker Showcase has been a core program of IASB for over 20 years, bringing together professional speakers looking to take their speaking business to the next level with professional booking agents from around the globe. More than just a showcase, IASBtalks provides actionable, relevant feedback to applicants on what agents are looking for and provides speakers selected for the program with exclusive opportunities to engage with agents before, during and after the live showcase.  Agents benefit also with increased talent knowledge plus a special booking incentive just for Members!

In support of their Mission, IASB conducts and reviews research on the speakers bureau industry, our programs and our member community in a variety of ways including studies, surveys and evaluations. The International Association of Speakers Bureaus (IASB), ImpactEleven and Stitch Marketing Research (StitchMR) have formed a 5-year strategic partnership to deliver groundbreaking, industry benchmarking data and analysis to IASB Members. The partnership will be focused on developing a quantitative and qualitative research initiative that delivers high-quality, comparative data and insights about the speaker bureau industry. The individual and summary reports along with the expert insight on key business performance metrics and trends, will assist members in assessing their performance and identifying areas for improvement and growth. The data will be gathered annually through a confidential study that will be conducted through an independent research firm, Stitch Marketing Research (StitchMR). The anonymized data will be analyzed to develop individual and aggregated reports plus presentations on the key findings and trends that will be provided to IASB Members.  An annual presentation will be provided at the IASB Annual Meeting by ImpactEleven with additional targeted virtual sessions held throughout the year on specific trends and guidance on using the data. Each IASB Member company will be invited to participate in the study and receive their report which includes the comparative summary on a complimentary basis.  Members will only be able to see their own data and the comparative data (benchmark) - they will not be able to see another company's data.

During the Coronavirus Pandemic, the IASB Community visibly demonstrated how to come together and support each other during a crisis.  In an effort to continue those positive interactions within our community, and create a space where we can all engage, discuss, share concerns, ask questions, and share best practices for the new reality, we launched the IASB Community Chat initiative.  

Featuring relevant, customized content for members presented by subject matter experts, seasoned industry professionals and world-class trainers in a virtual workshop environment.  Take away new techniques, essential business practices and specialized knowledge for successfully navigating a changing environment.

The IASBhub Program Series, originally launched in 2014, was designed to foster community in a regional setting.  In 2019, we transformed the program to a hybrid model to be able to connect more of our global community and advance our industry together.    The hub programs are offered 2-3 times a year and are sometimes co-located with another event being hosted by an IASB Partnering Organization.  The programs combine a thought leader with a peer-led interactive discussions and a post-program networking opportunity designed to foster knowledge, engagement and collaboration.  Select programs are recorded and may be accessed in the Archives* for 30 days post the live program date.

External links 

 Official Website: IASBweb.
 Events Industry Council (EIC)

References 

Organizations established in 1986
Speakers bureaus